Aaron Gillespie (born 13 March 1997) is an Irish cricketer. He made his List A debut for North West Warriors in the 2017 Inter-Provincial Cup on 29 May 2017. Prior to his List A debut, he was part of Ireland's squad for the 2016 Under-19 Cricket World Cup. He made his first-class debut for North West Warriors in the 2017 Inter-Provincial Championship on 30 May 2017. He made his Twenty20 debut for North West Warriors in the 2017 Inter-Provincial Trophy on 16 June 2017.

References

External links
 

1997 births
Living people
Irish cricketers
North West Warriors cricketers
Place of birth missing (living people)